We Are Still Here may refer to:

We Are Still Here (2015 film), a 2015 American horror film
We Are Still Here (2022 film), a 2022 Australian-New Zealand anthology film